Madame X is a 1920 American silent drama film directed by Frank Lloyd and starring Pauline Frederick. The film is based on the 1908 play Madame X, by French playwright Alexandre Bisson, and was adapted for the screen by J.E. Nash and Frank Lloyd. A copy of this film survives in the George Eastman House Motion Picture Collection.

The play was previously adapted for the screen in 1910 and in 1916. The play has been subsequently remade several times.

Plot
As described in a film magazine, jealous husband Louis Floriot (Courtleigh), refusing to forgive his wife Jacqueline (Frederick) for fleeing from his wrath and living with the friend who presses his attentions on her, forces her into the life of a derelict. Twenty years later she returns to France from Buenos Aires believing that her son Raymond has died. Laroque (Ainsworth), a crook who aids her in her return to France, learns that she is married to a man of wealth, and tries, with the help of his two associates M. Robert Parissard (Belmore) and M. Merival (Louis), to get possession of a fortune that rightfully belonged to Jacqueline. To protect her husband from violence, Jacqueline kills Laroque and, accused of murder, is brought to trial. Refusing to confer with her counsel and preferring death to freedom, during the course of the trial she receives the shocking revelation that the defendant attorney is her son Raymond (Ferguson). The tragic story ends with the reunion of the two and the death of the miserable mother.

Cast
 Pauline Frederick as Jacqueline Floriot
 William Courtleigh as Louis Floriot
 Casson Ferguson as Raymond Floriot
 Maude Louis as Rose Dubois (as Maud Louis)
 Hardee Kirkland as Dr. Chessel
 Alan Roscoe as Cesaire Noel
 John Hohenvest as M. Valmorin
 Correan Kirkham as Helene Valmorin
 Sidney Ainsworth as Laroque
 Lionel Belmore as M. Robert Parissard
 Willard Louis as M. Merival
 Cesare Gravina as Victor
 Maude George as Marie

Censorship
It was common at that time for American state film censorship boards to require cuts in films for reasons of morality or to promote the common good. One noted cut in this film required by the Pennsylvania film board was in a scene with Jesus and the woman taken in adultery where an intertitle card with a New Testament verse on sin and casting stones was removed.

Critical assessment
Film historian and biographer Higham, Charles reports that “Frank Lloyd’s best silent film was Madame X (1920), [demonstrating] his polished craftsmanship and advanced control of the language of physical gesture.”:

References

External links

1920 films
1920 drama films
Silent American drama films
American silent feature films
American black-and-white films
American films based on plays
Films directed by Frank Lloyd
Goldwyn Pictures films
1920s American films